VB 10 or Van Biesbroeck's star  is a very small and very dim red dwarf located in the constellation Aquila. It is part of a binary star system. 

VB 10 is historically notable as it was the coolest, least massive and least luminous known star from its discovery in 1944 until the discovery of LHS 2924 in 1983. VB 10 is the primary standard for the M8V spectral class. 

Although it is relatively close to Earth, at about 19 light years, VB 10 is a dim magnitude 17, making it difficult to image with amateur telescopes as it can get lost in the glare of the primary star.

History 

VB 10 was discovered in 1944 by the astronomer George van Biesbroeck using the  Otto Struve reflector telescope at the McDonald Observatory. He found it while surveying the telescopic field of view of the high-proper-motion red dwarf Gliese 752 (Wolf 1055), for companions. Wolf 1055 had been catalogued 25 years earlier by German astronomer Max Wolf using similar astrophotographic techniques. It is designated VB 10 in the 1961 publication of Van Biesbroeck's star catalog. Later, other astronomers began referring to it as Van Biesbroeck's star in honor of its discoverer. Because it is so dim and so close to its much brighter primary star, earlier astronomical surveys missed it even though its large parallax and large proper motion should have made it stand out on photographic plates taken at different times.

Characteristics 
VB 10 has an extremely low luminosity with a baseline absolute magnitude of nearly 19 and an apparent magnitude of 17.3 (somewhat variable), making it very difficult to see. 

Mathematical formulae for calculating apparent magnitude show that, if VB 10 occupied the place of the Sun, it would shine on Earth's sky at a magnitude of −12.87—approximately the same magnitude of that of the full moon. 

Later researchers also noted that its mass, at 0.08 solar mass, is right at the lower limit needed to create internal pressures and temperatures high enough to initiate nuclear fusion and actually be a star rather than a brown dwarf. At the time of its discovery it was the lowest-mass star known.

VB 10 is also notable by its very large proper motion, moving more than one arc second a year through the sky as seen from Earth.

Flare star
VB 10 is a variable star and is identified in the General Catalogue of Variable Stars as V1298 Aquilae. It is a UV Ceti-type variable star and is known to be subject to frequent flare events. Its dynamics were studied from the Hubble Space Telescope in the mid-1990s. Although VB 10 has a normal low surface temperature of 2600 K it was found to produce violent flares of up to 100,000 K.

Binary star

VB 10 is the secondary star of a bound binary star system. The primary is called Gliese 752, and hence VB 10 is also referred to as Gliese 752 B. The primary star is much larger and brighter. The two stars are separated by about 74 arc seconds (~434 AU).

Claims of a planetary system

In May 2009, astronomers from NASA's Jet Propulsion Laboratory, Pasadena, California, announced that they had found evidence of a planet orbiting VB 10, which they designated VB 10b. The  Hale telescope at the Palomar Observatory was used to detect evidence of this planet using the astrometry method. The new planet was claimed to have a mass 6 times that of Jupiter and an orbital period of 270 days. However, subsequent studies using Doppler spectroscopy failed to detect the radial velocity variations that would be expected if such a planet was orbiting this small star. The claimants of VB 10b note that these Doppler measurements only rule out planets more massive than 3 times the mass of Jupiter, but this limit is only half the reported best-fit mass of the planet as originally claimed. The claims for this planet thus fall into a long history of claimed astrometric extrasolar planet detections that were subsequently refuted.

By 2016, it was suspected that the asymmetric debris disk signal was mistaken for the long-period planet.

See also 
 List of least massive stars
 List of stars named after people

References

External links 
 

Aquila (constellation)
M-type main-sequence stars
Binary stars
Flare stars
0752
Aquilae, V1298
Hypothetical planetary systems
J19165762+0509021